Richard Estep Lankford (July 22, 1914 – September 22, 2003) represented the fifth district of the state of Maryland in the United States House of Representatives for five terms from 1955 to 1965.

Lankford was born in Wilmington, Delaware, and attended private schools in Baltimore, Maryland, and Alexandria, Virginia. He received his B.S. degree from the University of Virginia at Charlottesville in 1937, and his LL.B. degree from the University of Maryland, Baltimore in 1940. He was employed as a lawyer in private practice, and engaged in active management of tobacco and cattle farms.

During World War II, Lankford served in the United States Naval Reserve from 1942 to 1946. After the war, he was a member of the Maryland House of Delegates from 1948 to 1954, and was an unsuccessful Democratic candidate for election to the U.S. Congress in 1952.

He served on the Maryland Legislative Council in 1953, and was a delegate to the Democratic National Convention of 1956 before being elected to the U.S. Congress in 1954. He served from January 3, 1955, to January 3, 1965, but was not a candidate for renomination in 1964. Lankford did not sign the 1956 Southern Manifesto, and voted in favor of the Civil Rights Acts of 1957 and 1960, as well as the 24th Amendment to the U.S. Constitution, but voted present on the Civil Rights Act of 1964. He died in Easton, Maryland, aged 89.

References

 Retrieved on 2008-01-26

External links 

 Richard Estep Lankford papers at the University of Maryland libraries

1914 births
2003 deaths
United States Navy personnel of World War II
Democratic Party members of the Maryland House of Delegates
Politicians from Baltimore
People from Wilmington, Delaware
Military personnel from Maryland
United States Navy reservists
University of Maryland, Baltimore alumni
Democratic Party members of the United States House of Representatives from Maryland
20th-century American politicians